Hepcat(s) may refer to:

Hepcat, a term in jazz and beatnik subculture; see Hipster (1940s subculture)
Hepcat (band), a ska band
Hepcats, a comic book series